Sabina Karlsson is a Swedish plus-size model.

Early life
Karlsson is of Gambian descent through her mother, and Swedish descent through her father.

Career

Karlsson started modeling at age 4; she was discovered in a Swedish hair salon. She was originally a straight size model, working for Teen Vogue, Jean-Paul Gaultier and Armani, but changed to plus size modeling in 2010 so that she could maintain her natural weight. She struggled to shrink down to a size 2 at age 17. As a plus size model she has walked the runway for Michael Kors, Christian Siriano, and Chromat. She has modeled for H&M, J. Crew, Levi's, Lane Bryant, River Island, L'Oreal, Maybelline, and Victoria's Secret.

She has appeared in American Vogue, and Glamour.

Personal life
She gave birth to a son in June 2018.

References

1988 births
Living people
Swedish female models
Swedish people of Gambian descent
People from Stockholm
Plus-size models